The Review may refer to:
 The Review, a newspaper founded by Daniel Defoe in 1704
 The Review, a weekly newspaper that covers Glengarry—Prescott—Russell, Ontario, Canada
 The Review, a weekly newspaper at the University of Delaware
 UVU Review, an independent, student-run newspaper for Utah Valley University
 "The Review", a season 1 episode of the TV series Entourage
 The Weekend City Press Review, a UK weekly summary of business, corporate and economic news

See also 
 Review (disambiguation)